This list of richest American politicians includes current and former office-holders and political appointees, and is not necessarily adjusted for inflation. Estimated wealth is at least $100 million in 2012 dollars, for all the people listed here. The amounts listed here do not necessarily pertain to the politicians' time in office (i.e. some of them may have gotten much richer later on, or lost their money before they ran for office).

Presidents

Unsuccessful presidential candidates

Other U.S. politicians

References

See also 
 List of current members of the United States Congress by wealth
 List of presidents of the United States by net worth

Lists of American politicians
Politicians (richest American)

Economy of the United States-related lists